, also transliterated Ootori and Ohtori is a Japanese word meaning "large bird," "a key performer," or a Japanese name.

Possible writings
Ōtori can be written using different kanji characters and can mean:
大鳥, "large bird" or "big bird"
鴻, "Taiga bean goose" or "large bird" ("Oriental stork", "Whooper swan", etc...)
鳳, "Feng" (a male Fenghuang)
鳳凰, "Fenghuang" (Chinese phoenix)
大鳳, "Big Feng"
鵬, "Peng"
大鵬, "Big Peng" (Dapeng)
鷲, "Eagle"
大鷲, "Big Eagle" (Steller's sea eagle)
 大取 ·大取り, "a key performer; last performer of the day"
The name can also be written in hiragana or katakana.

Surname
 Ōtori Keisuke, a Japanese military commander
 Ran Ohtori, a member of Takarazuka Revue
 Yoshino Ohtori, a Japanese voice actor
 Ōtori Tanigorō, a sumo wrestler

Fictional characters

 Akio Ohtori, Revolutionary Girl Utena
 Amane Ohtori, Strawberry Panic!
 Choutarou Ohtori, The Prince of Tennis
 Gen Ohtori, Ultraman Leo
 Keiichiro and Utako Ohtori, Happy!
 Kirino Ootori, Ai Kora
 Kohaku Ōtori or Unity-chan, mascot of Unity
 Kyoya Ootori, Ouran High School Host Club
 Naru Ootori, Oretachi ni Tsubasa wa Nai
 Reika Ootori, Digimon Tamers
 Tsubasa Ōtori, W Wish
 Madoka Ōtori, "Fushigi Yuugi"
 Raging Ōtori, "Uta no Prince-sama"
 Eiichi Ōtori, "Uta no Prince-sama"
 Eiji Ōtori, "Uta no Prince-sama"
 Takeo Otori, Tales of the Otori
 Emu Otori, character in  Hatsune Miku: Colorful Stage!

See also
 Ōtori taisha (Ōtori Grand Shrine), a Shinto shrine in Osaka, Japan.
 Ōtori-class torpedo boat, a class of fast torpedo boats of the Imperial Japanese Navy.
 Hō, an EP by Maximum the Hormone
 Ho (disambiguation)
 Taiho (disambiguation)
 Washi (disambiguation)

References

Japanese-language surnames